The 1927–28 season was Newport County's eighth season in the Football League, seventh season in the Third Division South and eighth season overall in the third tier.

Season review

Results summary

Results by round

Fixtures and results

Third Division South

FA Cup

Welsh Cup

League table

P = Matches played; W = Matches won; D = Matches drawn; L = Matches lost; F = Goals for; A = Goals against; GA = Goal average; Pts = Points

External links
 Newport County 1927-1928 : Results
 Newport County football club match record: 1928
 Welsh Cup 1927/28

1927-28
English football clubs 1927–28 season
1927–28 in Welsh football